Bhima Rao (born 25 November 1987) is an Indian cricketer who plays for Railways. He made his first-class debut on 30 October in the 2015–16 Ranji Trophy.

References

External links
 

1987 births
Living people
Indian cricketers
Railways cricketers
Jharkhand cricketers
Ahmedabad Rockets cricketers
Hyderabad Heroes cricketers
People from Bhilai
Cricketers from Chhattisgarh